Fiefs is a commune in the Pas-de-Calais department in the Hauts-de-France region of France.

Geography

Population
The inhabitants are called Fieffois.

Places of interest
 The modern church of St. Germain, built in 1957.

See also
Communes of the Pas-de-Calais department

References

Communes of Pas-de-Calais